USS Pocomoke is a name given to three ships of the United States Navy:

 , a minesweeper and tug commissioned in 1917 and sold in 1922
 , a patrol vessel in commission from 1917 to 1918
 , a seaplane tender in commission from 1941 to 1946

References 

United States Navy ship names